Cola Franzen (February 4, 1923 – April 5, 2018) was an American writer and translator.

Life
She published more than twenty books of translations, by notable Spanish and Latin American authors.

She was a member of ALTA (American Literary Translators Association) and vice-president of Language Research, Inc., founded by I.A. Richards, in Cambridge, Massachusetts.

She supported James N. Yamazaki's story publication.

Her work has appeared in Two Lines, Puerto del sol, Temblor, New American Writing.

Awards
 2000 Harold Morton Landon Translation Award
 2004 Gregory Kolovakos Award from PEN American Center for expansion of Hispanic Literature to an English-language audience

Works

Translations
 
 
 
 
 Alicia Borinsky The Collapsible Couple/ La pareja desmontable, a book of poems in bilingual translation (2000)
 
 
 
 

 
 
 
 
  (reprinted 1995)) based on Emilio García Gómez's Poemas arábigoandaluces.

References

External links 

 Cola Franzen papers at the Lilly Library, Indiana University Bloomington.

People from Hart County, Georgia
Spanish–English translators
1923 births
2018 deaths
20th-century translators